The leopard tree frog (Boana pardalis) is a species of frog in the family Hylidae endemic to Brazil. Its natural habitats are subtropical or tropical dry forests, subtropical or tropical moist lowland forests, subtropical or tropical moist montane forests, freshwater marshes, intermittent freshwater marshes, plantations, rural gardens, heavily degraded former forests, ponds, and canals and ditches.

References

Boana
Endemic fauna of Brazil
Amphibians described in 1824
Taxonomy articles created by Polbot